The IBM ThinkPad 560 is a notebook series from the ThinkPad line by IBM. It has been argued that the ThinkPad 560 was the first ultraportable notebook.

Models

Reception 
The laptop won the iF Product Design Award in 1997 for the product discipline. A review by ZDNet considered the ThinkPad 560X a good desktop replacement if it was combined with a port replicator.

References

External links 
 Thinkwiki.de - 560

IBM laptops
ThinkPad